Thomas Vaughan  (born 1864) was a Welsh international footballer. He was part of the Wales national football team, playing 1 match on 14 March 1885 against England.

See also
 List of Wales international footballers (alphabetical)

References

1864 births
Welsh footballers
Wales international footballers
Place of birth missing
Year of death missing
Association footballers not categorized by position